The Inter-Agency Committee on Anti-Illegal Drugs (ICAD) is an inter-governmental forum in the Philippines responsible for ensuring government agencies in implementing and complying with all policies pertaining to the anti-illegal drug campaign. The agency was formed by Executive Order No. 5, signed by President Rodrigo Duterte on March 6, 2017.

The agency is divided into four clusters—enforcement, justice, advocacy, and rehabilitation and reintegration.

Member agencies

The agency is chaired by Philippine Drug Enforcement Agency (PDEA) Director-General Aaron Aquino. Vice President Leni Robredo, referred to as the drug czar, served as co-chairperson of the agency from November 6 to November 24, 2019. The member agencies of the committee are:

 Dangerous Drugs Board
 Department of the Interior and Local Government
 Department of Justice
 Department of Health
 Department of Education
 Department of Social Welfare and Development
 Department of Trade and Industry
 Department of Agriculture
 Department of National Defense
 Technical Education and Skills Development Authority
 Philippine Information Agency
 Public Attorney's Office
 Office of the Solicitor General
 Philippine Coast Guard
 Philippine National Police
 National Bureau of Investigation
 Bureau of Customs
 Bureau of Immigration
 Armed Forces of the Philippines
 Anti-Money Laundering Council

References

Philippine Drug War
Presidency of Rodrigo Duterte
2017 establishments in the Philippines
Establishments by Philippine executive order